Shahzad Rafiq (also spelled Shehzad Rafique) is a Pakistani film director. Films he has produced and directed include Nikah, Ghunghat, Rukhsati, Salakhain and Mohabbataan Sachiyaan. His films have been presented at several film festivals in Asia. He introduced many new faces in Lollywood, notably Ahsan Khan in Nikkah (1998), Ahmed Butt and Sajid Hasan in Salakhain (2004), Adnan Khan and Maria Khan in Mohabbatan Sachiyan (2007) and Wiam Dahmani in Ishq Khuda (2012).

Filmography

Director

Producer
the best film in his two decade career is nikah that's consider as classic in cinema of 90s of lollywood

Films in festivals 
 1997 - Ghunghat in Tashkent international film festival
 1998 - Ghunghat in Dubai Film Festival
 1999 - Nikah in SAARC film festival, Sri Lanka
 2004 - Ghunghat, Nikah and Rukhsati in Beijing film festival, China
 2005 - Salakhain in Kara Film Festival, Karachi
 2008 - Mohabbtaan Sachiyaan in South Asian film festival, India
 2010 - Mohabbtaan Sachiyaan in Muscat International Film Festival
 2011 - Mohabbbtaan Sachiyaan and Shackles in SAARC film festival, Sri Lanka

References

External links
 

Living people
Pakistani film directors
People from Gujranwala District
Punjabi people
Year of birth missing (living people)